Nathaniel Job Hammond (December 26, 1833 – April 20, 1899) was a jurist and politician from the American state of Georgia. A Democrat, Hammond was the Attorney General of Georgia from 1872–1877, before serving in the United States House of Representatives from 1879–1887.

Early years and education
Hammond was born in Elbert County, Georgia on December 26, 1833, to Amos Worrill and Eliza Caroline (Hudson) Hammond. He graduated from the University of Georgia in Athens in 1852 at the age of 19, with a Bachelor of Arts. He was admitted to the state bar the next year and began practicing law in Atlanta, Georgia in partnership with his father.

Legal career
In 1861, Hammond was elected as the solicitor general of the Atlanta circuit and served in that position until 1865.  In 1867, he became a reporter of the Supreme Court of Georgia and served in that capacity until 1872 when he became Georgia's attorney general (1872–1877). Hammond also served as a trustee of the University of Georgia beginning in 1871 and remained on the board until his death in 1899. He was Chairman his last few years of service and authored a book entitled The University of Georgia and the Constitution as well as The University of Georgia: A Short History of its Endowment and Legal Status.

Hammond was a member and noted leader of the Georgia constitutional conventions in 1865 and 1877 that were tasked with creating a new state constitution. He also served as president of the board of trustees of the Atlanta College of Physicians and Surgeons.

Political service
In 1878, Hammond won election to the United States House of Representatives and was re-elected for three more terms (1880, 1882, and 1884) before losing his seat in 1886 to John D. Stewart.

Later years and death
Hammond married Laura Lewis in 1858. After his election defeat in 1886 he resumed his career as a lawyer. He died in Atlanta on April 20, 1899, and was buried in that city's Oakland Cemetery.

References

External links
 
 History of the University of Georgia, Thomas Walter Reed,  Imprint:  Athens, Georgia : University of Georgia, ca. 1949 pp. 556–557
 

1833 births
1899 deaths
Georgia (U.S. state) lawyers
Georgia (U.S. state) Attorneys General
University of Georgia alumni
Democratic Party members of the United States House of Representatives from Georgia (U.S. state)
American slave owners
19th-century American politicians
Burials at Oakland Cemetery (Atlanta)
19th-century American lawyers